Indriði Sigurðsson (born 12 October 1981) is an Icelandic former football defender. He last played for the Icelandic club KR Reykjavik.

Club career
He started his career in KR Reykjavik, and went to Norway to play for Lillestrøm SK in 2000. In September 2003 he moved on to KRC Genk in Belgium. Indriði transferred back to KR Reykjavik on 29 July 2006. After a short spell at KR, he was transferred to Lyn on 8 August 2006. On 3 August 2009, Indriði signed for Viking. With a total of 298 appearances, no foreign player has played more games in the Norwegian Premier League than Sigurðsson.

On 28 July 2017, Indriði announced his retirement due to health reasons.

International career
Indriði has been capped 65 times and has scored 2 goals for Iceland. He made his debut in January 2000 against Norway.

Career statistics

International goals

References

External links
 Profile at lyn.no
 Profile at lynfotball.net
 Bio at KRC Genk

1981 births
Living people
Indridi Sigurdsson
Indridi Sigurdsson
Indridi Sigurdsson
Indridi Sigurdsson
Indridi Sigurdsson
Indridi Sigurdsson
Indridi Sigurdsson
Lillestrøm SK players
K.R.C. Genk players
Lyn Fotball players
Viking FK players
Belgian Pro League players
Eliteserien players
Indridi Sigurdsson
Expatriate footballers in Norway
Expatriate footballers in Belgium
Indridi Sigurdsson
Indridi Sigurdsson
Association football defenders